Purvasha Sudhir Shende is an Indian Archer. She won the Bronze Medal Asian Games 2014 in Incheon in the Women's team compound event along with Surekha Jyothi and Trisha Deb. She is a young budding archer the country has produced.

References

Living people
Indian female archers
Asian Games medalists in archery
Archers at the 2014 Asian Games
Asian Games bronze medalists for India
Medalists at the 2014 Asian Games
1998 births
Place of birth missing (living people)